Mesmerize is an Interactive art game developed by London Studio in association with Playlogic Entertainment for the PlayStation 3 platform, which utilizes the PlayStation Eye camera peripheral. It was released on the PlayStation Store on December 20, 2007.

Gameplay 
Mesmerize is a suite of visual and aural effects that respond to the user's body movements and sounds, such as clapping hands or clicking fingers. By moving their body and making sounds, the user can manipulate shapes, colours and lights as they appear on-screen. The game contains a selection of different modes to choose from, including Chain Reaction, Firefly, Twister, Flare, Genepool, Flora, Fallout, Blurmotion, Pincushion and Urban. The visual effects displayed will change with the mode the user chooses.

Reception 
Playstation Official Magazine UK rated the game 50/100, stating that "It's a cheap way to show off your sexy new HDTV".

References

2007 video games
Art games
Life simulation games
London Studio games
Playlogic Entertainment games
PlayStation 3 games
PlayStation 3-only games
PlayStation Eye games
PlayStation Network games
Single-player video games
Sony Interactive Entertainment games
Video games developed in the United Kingdom